Atlas Jewellery is an Indian owned jewellery retailer headquartered in Dubai, with 41 stores across the Middle East, in the UAE, Oman, Qatar, Bahrain, Saudi Arabia, Kuwait and India. The company's stores have a large range of jewellery in the gold, diamond, pearl, and gemstone categories. Founded by Dr. M. M. Ramachandran in 1981, the first Atlas Jewellery store was established in Kuwait.

Products 
Atlas Jewellery stores display a wide range of jewellery in gold, diamond, pearl and gemstones.

References

Further reading

External links 
 Official website

Atlas Jewellery
Atlas Jewellery
Atlas Jewellery
Atlas Jewellery
Atlas Jewellery